The 1973–74 Whitbread Round the World Race, the first edition of the Whitbread Round the World Race, started off from Portsmouth, England on 8 September 1973. Seventeen yachts of various sizes and rigs took part. During the race three sailors were swept over board and died: Paul Waterhouse, Dominique Guillet and Bernie Hosking. Waterhouse and Guillet were never to be seen again.

The crew of the Mexican yacht Sayula II, a brand new Swan 65 owned and skippered by Mexican Captain Ramón Carlin, won the overall race in 133 days and 13 hours. Her actual time was 152 days. In 2016, this adventure was presented in a documentary film called The Weekend Sailor.

Legs

Results

References

External links
Full details of finishing positions

The Ocean Race
Whitbread Round The World Race, 1973-74
Whitbread Round The World Race, 1973-74